KHNL (channel 13) is a television station in Honolulu, Hawaii, United States, serving the Hawaiian Islands as an affiliate of NBC. It is owned by Gray Television alongside CBS affiliate KGMB (channel 5) and Kailua-Kona–licensed Telemundo affiliate KFVE (channel 6). The stations share studios on Waiakamilo Road in downtown Honolulu, while KHNL's transmitter is located in Akupu, Hawaii.

History

The first Channel 13 (KHVH-TV, 1957–1959)
On May 5, 1957, Kaiser Broadcasting signed on the first independent station in Hawaii with the call letters KHVH-TV (to match its AM sister station and its reference to the Hawaiian Village Hotel at the time), taking the VHF channel 13 position. KHVH-TV was the first station to bring color television to Hawaii, and at the time was billed as a movie station (its first on-air program was Thirty Seconds Over Tokyo at 7 p.m., then signed off afterwards upon the film's completion), boasting a large motion picture library from MGM and Warner Bros., along with cartoons from Warner's animation library, serials, short subjects, and educational films produced by Encyclopædia Britannica. This made up a majority of its programming schedule, with 3 or 4 movies airing from 2 p.m. to 11 p.m. daily, depending on the length of the films.

But its brief time on the air was not successful and it was plagued by a lack of programming material available to air in Hawaii and financial difficulties. This resulted in Kaiser merging its operations with KULA-TV (channel 4) in 1958, and signing channel 13 off the air in 1959 (KULA would eventually take the KHVH-TV calls after channel 13 left the air, using it until 1973). Because of its merger with KULA, KHVH-TV's history is tied to KITV through Kaiser's purchase of that station and is unrelated to the current channel 13.

Independent station (KTRG/KIKU)
After the channel was left vacant for three years, the Watumull Broadcasting Company was awarded the license by the Federal Communications Commission (FCC) and signed the station on the air on July 4, 1962 as KTRG, broadcasting its signal from a transmitter on top of the Hawaiian Village Hotel in Waikiki. Operating as an independent station in its second go-round, KTRG aired English language programming from 5 p.m. to 12:30 a.m. daily. On the day that KTRG was set to debut, a technical glitch (due to last-minute repairs at the transmitter site to get it corrected) delayed the station's 5 p.m. debut, which meant viewers did not get to see the station launch until 10:10 p.m. that evening; its first full day of programming would start a day later on July 5. Like other independent stations in the United States, KTRG aired reruns of off-network and first-run syndicated programs (such as Jeff's Collie, The Texan, Riverboat, Leave It to Beaver and Supercar), as well as producing local shows like The Gripe Box (a talk show), Wally & Harvey (which featured Little Rascals shorts), and a local version of Romper Room, the latter later moving to KHON in 1966. It also aired movies nightly from 11:30 p.m. to 5:30 a.m., along with hourly news updates.

By 1963, KTRG began adding Japanese-language programming. The station came under new ownership on January 15, 1966. In 1967, KTRG changed its call letters to KIKU and began broadcasting from a new studio facility on Puuhale Road; at this point, the station began offering English programming from 1 to 5 and 10 to 11 p.m., with Japanese programming from 5 to 10 p.m. By 1972, KIKU carried Japanese programming for nearly the entire broadcast day. Its schedule included several tokusatsu series aimed at children (such as Kamen Rider V3, Rainbowman, Ganbare!! Robocon and Battle Fever J).

Mid-Pacific Television Associates, owned by the Cushman family of San Diego in partnership with TV Asahi and ten local investors, bought the station on April 9, 1979. Beginning in 1980, it ran English programming (like Hour Magazine and The John Davidson Show), along with cartoons and old movies from 7 a.m. to 7 p.m.; this was followed by Japanese programming from 7 to 10 p.m. and English programming again from 10 p.m. until sign-off. In 1981, the station returned to being a full-time English language general entertainment station running a blend of cartoons, sitcoms, westerns, movies, and for a brief time, a local newscast. It also picked up ABC daytime shows that were preempted by KITV (channel 4). Japanese programming moved to various UHF stations in the market. In 1984, the station's callsign was changed to the current KHNL (the KIKU call letters now reside on an unrelated station on channel 20 in Honolulu), it then branded itself as the "News Alternative" and "Free Movie Channel"; the station also acquired the rights to broadcast University of Hawaii at Manoa sporting events.

Fox affiliate
In 1986, the station was acquired by the King Broadcasting Company of Seattle. On October 9 of that year, KHNL became a charter affiliate of Fox (becoming one of a handful of stations on the VHF dial to carry the new network at its launch), which at the time aired only a late night talk show The Late Show Starring Joan Rivers; prime time programming followed in April 1987 with such series as The Tracey Ullman Show and Married... with Children. Also in 1986, the station added a translator in Maui, K21AG under a lease agreement with owner Scala Broadcasting; the translator was eventually divested to LeSEA Broadcasting in July 1990. In June 1987, K65BV in Kauai became a KHNL translator through the ownership of the Channel 13 Club. In May 1989, KHBC-TV in Hilo became a full-time satellite of KHNL. In August 1990, KOGG began broadcasting on Maui as a satellite.

It was not until September 1993, after King Broadcasting was acquired by the Providence Journal Company, that KHNL adopted the "Fox 13" branding. On May 5 of that year, the station entered into a local marketing agreement (LMA) with KFVE (then on channel 5), which merged its operations into KHNL's facility. In January 1994, all University of Hawaii sports telecasts were moved to KFVE. In August 1994, Burnham Broadcasting-owned KHON-TV (channel 2) was sold to SF Broadcasting, a joint venture between Savoy Pictures and Fox (the network owning a voting stock in Savoy), in a four-station group deal. As a result of the sale, KHON announced it would drop its affiliation with NBC to become the market's new Fox affiliate through a groupwide affiliation deal with the network. At first, NBC considered affiliating with ABC affiliate KITV. However, after Argyle purchased the station in 1995, KITV renewed its affiliation agreement with ABC instead. NBC later reached an affiliation deal with KHNL.

NBC affiliate

Just prior to formally affiliating with NBC, KHNL began construction of the first fully digital newsroom in the world. It also became the first to utilize fiber optic technology to broadcast live feeds from the neighboring islands. Former KITV anchor Dan Cooke and sports anchor Robert Kekaula (who later returned to KITV) joined KHNL's news department during that time. On January 1, 1996, KHNL switched network affiliations with KHON, with KHNL affiliating with NBC and KHON joining Fox. KHNL was branded as "NBC Hawaii News 8" (for the station's channel position on most Hawaiian cable providers, although KHNL had used its cable channel in its news branding when its news department launched in April 1995). That year, KHNL won the first Regional Emmy Award for best local news broadcast. When the Providence Journal Company merged with Belo Corporation on February 28, 1997, the station struck a deal with the Honolulu Star-Bulletin newspaper to share polling services.

On October 29, 1999, Belo sold KHNL and its LMA with KFVE to Raycom Media, along with KASA-TV in Albuquerque, New Mexico (now a Telemundo owned-and-operated station). Raycom acquired KFVE outright two months after the company completed its purchase of KHNL, creating one of the first official commercially licensed duopolies in the country. On May 11, 2002, KHBC launched a digital signal on UHF channel 22. In 2003, KHNL received national exposure after Triumph the Insult Comic Dog visited the station to appear on one of its newscasts; excerpts were seen in a comedy bit that aired on Late Night with Conan O'Brien. Triumph was actually invited to the station after talking with people auditioning for American Idol during that program's audition tour stop in Hawaii. In November 2008, KHNL relocated from its original studios on Sand Island Access Road (Route 64/Route 640) to the KHNL/KFVE facility on Waiakamilo Road.

SSA with KGMB
On August 18, 2009, KHNL and MCG Capital Corporation (owner of CBS affiliate KGMB) entered into a shared services agreement (SSA) under which KGMB's operations, including its news department, would be combined with KHNL and KFVE. The agreement would see KGMB relocate from its studios on Kapiolani Boulevard in downtown Honolulu to the KHNL/KFVE facility on Waiakamilo Road; it would also see KGMB come under Raycom ownership, moving from channel 9 to channel 5, while KFVE would move from channels 5 to 9 and fall under MCG Capital's ownership. Citing "the economic reality... that this market cannot support five traditionally separated television stations, all with duplicated costs," and facing the risk of "the loss of one, or possibly two stations in Hawaii," Raycom President Paul McTear said the SSA would "preserve three stations that provide important and valuable local, national and international programming to viewers in Hawaii."

The plan, however, has met with criticism from organizations such as Media Council Hawaii which viewed the plan as a way to circumvent FCC duopoly rules that prevent one company owning two of the four highest-rated stations in a single market (the FCC only recognizes ownership of facility identifications and not a station's call sign or intellectual property, and as such Raycom's ownership of both KHNL and KGMB, once it moved to channel 5, would be allowed as the overall viewership of channel 5, as KFVE, fell outside the criteria that would have otherwise barred a duopoly between KHNL and KGMB if facility IDs were traded as well). The SSA took effect on October 26, 2009, at which point KHNL dropped its "NBC 8" branding in favor of simply branding by its call letters (KGMB and KFVE, who swapped dial positions on that date, adopted similar branding approaches as well). An estimated 68 positions from a total of 198 between the three stations would be eliminated as part of the agreement.

On March 2, 2011, KHNL's high definition feed began to be carried by DirecTV on channel 13. This left KFVE as the only station in the market whose HD feed was not offered by the satellite provider, it was carried by DirecTV only in 4:3 standard definition and widescreen SD (KFVE's HD feed was later added on February 29, 2012).

Removal from Nielsen ratings
Beginning in 2016, the Hawaii News Now (HNN) group of KGMB, KHNL, and KFVE severed ties to the Nielsen ratings. After the November 25 sweeps, Raycom opted to use other research to track KHNL and KGMB audiences. KFVE, owned by HITV, is affected also. In Hawaii, Nielsen does not use electronic means to track audiences. Recently, only 914 of the printed Nielsen booklets, known as monthly diaries, were completed out of 11,400 diaries. KITV and KHON will continue to use Nielsen ratings.

Sale to Gray Television
On June 25, 2018, Atlanta-based Gray Television announced it had reached an agreement with Raycom to merge their respective broadcasting assets (consisting of Raycom's 63 existing owned-and/or-operated television stations, including KGMB and KHNL), and Gray's 93 television stations) under the former's corporate umbrella. In the cash-and-stock merger transaction, valued at $3.6 billion, Gray shareholders would acquire preferred stock currently held by Raycom. Because Raycom operates three stations in the Honolulu market, the companies were required to sell either KHNL, KGMB or KFVE to another station owner in order to comply with FCC ownership rules.

On November 1, 2018, Nexstar Media Group—which has owned Fox affiliate KHON-TV since January 2017—announced that it would acquire KFVE and the licenses of satellites KGMD-TV and KGMV from American Spirit Media for $6.5 million. Nexstar concurrently assumed the station's operations through a time brokerage agreement (TBA) that took effect the day the transaction paperwork was filed with the FCC, under which Raycom forwarded the rights to certain managerial services involving KFVE—not counting certain other services to which Raycom would retain stewardship under the TBA—on a transitional basis. Under the deal, Nexstar would integrate KFVE's operations into KHON's studio facilities at the Haiwaiki Tower on Piikoi and Waimanu Streets. However, Raycom would retain rights to the KFVE intellectual unit (call letters, syndicated and local programming), which was shifted to a digital subchannel of either KHNL or KGMB as will KFVE-DT2's Bounce TV affiliation (which was moved to KGMB-DT4); the KFVE calls would also be retained by Raycom for branding continuity. As such, Nexstar would likely assign new call letters to the channel 9 license as well as acquire programming to replace that being maintained by Raycom post-acquisition (which may include shifting the programming on KHON's CW-affiliated DT2 feed to the KFVE license, and/or the retention of the MyNetworkTV affiliation, which Raycom did not include in the KFVE intellectual property transaction.)

The sale of KFVE to Nexstar was approved by the FCC on December 17; the Gray-Raycom merger was approved three days later. The sale was completed on January 2, 2019.

Programming
As of September 2022, KHNL generally clears all NBC programming. However, some network shows (particularly those airing outside of prime time) are aired out of pattern. NBC News Daily, which replaced Days of Our Lives on the network's daytime schedule on September 12, 2022, after the soap opera moved exclusively to streaming on Peacock, airs on KHNL at 11:00 a.m. local time following Today with Hoda & Jenna. The station had previously aired Days of Our Lives at 1:00 p.m. (its usual network timeslot) and the rest of NBC's daytime programming in pattern from the start of its NBC affiliation in 1996. KHNL also airs the shows featured within NBC's The More You Know E/I programming block in various timeslots throughout its weekly schedule rather than as a continuous block on weekends, largely due to the network's weekend sports programming airing live on the station during the late morning and afternoon hours when the E/I block would otherwise air.

News operation

KHNL presently broadcasts 27 hours of locally produced newscasts each week (with five hours on weekdays, and one hour each on Saturdays and Sundays).

As KTRG, the station aired a start-up weeknight 10 p.m. newscast called Nightly News that was broadcast from the station's original studios at Royal Block on Kalakaua Avenue; this program was later retitled as The Big News, anchored by Wayne Collins.

In January 1995, prior to joining NBC, KHNL became the last of the major network affiliates in Hawaii to form its own news department. King Broadcasting invested $5 million in an all-digital facility; on April 17, 1995, the station launched a prime time newscast at 9 p.m. that was simulcast on sister station KFVE. News broadcasts expanded that year with the addition of a 10 p.m. newscast on June 19, followed by the debut of a 5 p.m. newscast on July 24, and a 6 p.m. newscast on November 30. Upon joining NBC, the station added a two-hour weekday morning newscast from 5 to 7 a.m. on January 1, 1996. An audio simulcast of its 6 p.m. newscast began airing on KUMU (1500 AM) on January 6, 1997. The KHNL-produced 9 p.m. newscast on KFVE was dropped on August 3 of that year.

On August 31, 1997, KHNL debuted a sports magazine and wrap-up show called Sports Sunday Hawaii. On June 1, 1999, the weeknight 6 o'clock show began simulcasting on KCCN-AM (1420). The station debuted "Chopper 8", the only television helicopter in the market, on April 5, 2000. On April 1, 2002, the station's weekday morning program was reduced to 90 minutes, cutting the start time to 5:30 a.m. A news share agreement was established with KKBG (97.9 FM), KLEO (106.1 FM), KHLO-AM, and KKOA (107.7 FM) on October 10. KHNL entered into a partnership with KIKU (channel 20) to broadcast nightly news updates for the station on February 3, 2003. On October 18, 2004, KHNL began producing a half-hour prime time newscast at 9 p.m. for KFVE, restoring news to that station after seven years. On January 7, 2007, the station began producing a weeknight 6:30 p.m. newscast for KFVE. On December 3, 2007, KHNL debuted a midday newscast at noon, this program has since been dropped. On December 22, 2008, KHNL became the first television station in Hawaii to begin broadcasting its local newscasts in high definition; the KFVE newscasts were included in the upgrade.

The origins of the three stations sharing their resources was announced on August 18, 2009, when MCG Capital Corporation and Raycom Media (owner of KHNL and, at the time, KFVE) announced a shared services agreement that would result in Raycom merging the three stations' operations into the KHNL/KFVE studios on Waiakamilo Road in Honolulu (KGMB would vacate its studios on Kapiolani Boulevard). Though non-news programming would remain in place, news operations of the three stations would be combined into one entity. KFVE's newscasts would remain in place.

The shared services agreement resulted in the termination of all but four members of KHNL's on-air staff and all of the technicians for KHNL's morning show when its newsroom merged with KGMB and the two began simulcasting newscasts on October 26, 2009. The two stations began to jointly produce and simulcast weeknight 5 and 10 p.m. newscasts, while KHNL moved its 6 p.m. newscast to 5:30. KGMB continues to have its own weeknight 6 p.m. newscast. The only times when KGMB and KHNL do not simulcast news programming are on weekdays during the 7 a.m. hour when KHNL airs NBC's Today, at 5:30 p.m. when KGMB airs the CBS Evening News and at 6 p.m. when KHNL airs NBC Nightly News. Weekday morning and weekend shows are simulcast on the two stations, but are subject to preemption on one of the stations due to network obligations. The local news schedule on KFVE remains unchanged. There is no weekday midday news on either station.

Notable former on-air staff
 Maria Quiban – weather anchor (now with KTTV in Los Angeles)

Technical information

The stations' digital signals are multiplexed:

KHNL previously carried NBC Weather Plus on its second digital subchannel until the network shut down on December 31, 2008; it was then replaced with a 720p simulcast of sister station KGMB, before the subchannel was eventually deleted altogether (KHNL's Hilo satellite station KHBC-TV, however, continues to carry KGMB programming on its DT3 subchannel, as KGMB's Hilo translator, K45CT-D, maintains a very weak signal that does not reach the entire island). On May 27, 2012, KHNL relaunched its DT2 subchannel as an affiliate of Antenna TV (replacing KUPU (channel 15) as the market's affiliate).

Analog-to-digital conversion
KHNL discontinued regular programming on its analog signal, over VHF channel 13, on January 15, 2009, the date in which full-power television stations in Hawaii transitioned from analog to digital broadcasts (almost five months earlier than the June 12 transition date for stations on the U.S. mainland). The station's digital signal remained on its pre-transition UHF channel 35, using PSIP to display the station's virtual channel as its former VHF analog channel 13.

At the same time, KHBC-TV's digital signal remained on its pre-transition UHF channel 22 (using its former analog channel 2 as its virtual channel), while KOGG's digital signal remained on its pre-transition UHF channel 16 (using its former analog channel 15 as its virtual channel) for post-transition digital operations.

Satellite stations
As with other major television stations in Hawaii, KHNL operates satellite stations across the Hawaiian Islands to rebroadcast the station's programming outside of metropolitan Honolulu.

KHNL is also rebroadcast on translator  in Lihue.

References

External links
HawaiiNewsNow.com - KHNL/KGMB-TV official website
HawaiiNewsNow.com/K5/ - KHNL-DT2 official website
KHNL.AntennaTV.tv - Antenna TV Hawaii official website

HNL
NBC network affiliates
Antenna TV affiliates
Grit (TV network) affiliates
Gray Television
Television channels and stations established in 1962
1962 establishments in Hawaii